Zienia Merton (11 December 1945 – 14 September 2018) was a British actress born in Burma. She was known for playing Sandra Benes in Space: 1999.

Early career
Merton was the daughter of Minny and Cecil Burton. Her mother was Burmese, and her father was a half-English, half-French merchant. She was raised in Singapore, Portugal and England. She was educated at first in Portugal, but was later sent to Arts Educational school (today the Tring Park School for the Performing Arts) in Hertfordshire. Her first stage performance was as a dancer (playing a rat) in a Christmas 1957 production of The Nutcracker ballet at the Royal Festival Hall.

Merton's first significant science-fiction credit was as Ping-Cho in the 1964 Doctor Who story Marco Polo, long since lost in its original form. Her other early television appearances included Strange Report (1968), The Six Wives of Henry VIII (1970) and Jason King (1971). She was a lead actress as Christina in the 1971 Dennis Potter TV adaptation of Casanova with Frank Finlay, and appeared on The Benny Hill Show in 1972, playing the wife of Hill's Chow Mein character. Her film roles included a brief appearance as an Asian high priestess in the Beatles' film Help! (1965), as Ting Ling in the film The Chairman (1969) with Gregory Peck, and The Adventurers (1970).

Space: 1999
Probably her most notable role is that of Sandra Benes in Space: 1999, the science fiction series produced by Gerry Anderson and Sylvia Anderson between 1973 and 1976, with Martin Landau, Barbara Bain, Barry Morse and Catherine Schell. In 1999, Merton reprised this role in the professionally produced short film Message from Moonbase Alpha, written by series writer Johnny Byrne. This short episode surprised everyone on its debut at the closing ceremony of the Breakaway 1999 convention in Los Angeles, California, on 13 September 1999 – the date on which the moon is blasted out of Earth orbit in the pilot episode of the original series. Regarded by many fans as the 49th and final episode, and providing a closure to the series, Message from Moonbase Alpha is included as a special feature on the UFO and Space: 1999 Documentaries DVD, available exclusively from Fanderson.

Other performances
Following Space: 1999, Merton appeared in many popular television series including Grange Hill, Return of the Saint (1979), Bergerac (1983), Angels (1983), Tenko (1984), Dempsey & Makepeace (1985), Lovejoy (1986), Crime Traveller (1997), Doctors (2001), Dinotopia (2002), Casualty (1986–2002), EastEnders (1998–2003), The Bill (1999–2005), Judge John Deed (2006), Coronation Street (2008) and Wire in the Blood (2008).

In December 2008, Merton filmed a guest role for the eighth episode ("Samaritan") of the ITV drama Law & Order: UK. Although the series premiered on 23 February 2009, some episodes were held over for broadcast as "Series Two". "Samaritan" was first transmitted on ITV1 on 11 January 2010.

In May 2009, Merton returned to the world of Doctor Who, 45 years after her appearance in Marco Polo, to record a special episode of The Sarah Jane Adventures in the two-part episode The Wedding of Sarah Jane Smith, broadcast on BBC One on 29 and 30 October 2009.

In 2018, Merton narrated BBC Audio's release of the novelisation of Marco Polo. This turned out to be her final professional engagement.

Death
Merton was diagnosed with terminal cancer in 2017, and died 14 September 2018.

Books

Filmography

Film

Television

References

External links

1945 births
2018 deaths
20th-century British actresses
21st-century British actresses
Anglo-Burmese people
British actresses of Asian descent
British film actresses
British people of Burmese descent
Place of death missing
British people of French descent
British soap opera actresses
British television actresses
People from Maungdaw